Jedburgh may refer to:
  Jedburgh - a town and former royal burgh in the Scottish Borders and the traditional county town of the historic county of Roxburghshire.
 Jedburgh and District (ward)
 Jedburgh Grammar School
 Jedburgh Town Hall
 Jedburgh Library
 Jedburgh railway station
 The Kelso and Jedburgh railway branch lines
 Jedburgh television relay station
 Munro's of Jedburgh
 Jedburgh, Saskatchewan, Canada.
 Jedburgh Abbey
 Jedburgh Castle
 Jedforest, also known as Jedburgh Forest
 Operation Jedburgh
 Marquessate of Lothian, whose Subsidiary titles include Lord Jedburgh
 Darius Jedburgh, a major character from the 1985 TV Mini-series Edge of Darkness and the 2010 film adaptation.